Don Valley was a federal electoral district of the House of Commons of Canada from 1968 to 1979. It was located in the province of Ontario. This riding was created in 1966 from parts of Eglinton, York East and York—Scarborough ridings.

It consisted of the part of Metropolitan Toronto bounded by a line beginning where the Don River would meet Donlands Avenue, east along the Don River, north along the West Branch of the Don River, east along Eglinton Avenue East, north along the Don River, west along Lawrence Avenue East, north along Don Mills Road, west along Bond Avenue, north along Leslie Street, west along York Mills Road, north along Bayview Avenue, southwest along Highway 401, south along Yonge Street, east along Merton Street, south along Bayview Avenue, east and south along the northern limit of the Township of East York, and east along the Don River to Donlands Avenue.

The electoral district was abolished in 1976 when it was redistributed between Don Valley West, Rosedale and York East ridings.

Members of Parliament

This riding has elected the following Members of Parliament:

Election results

|}

|}

|}

See also 

 List of Canadian federal electoral districts
 Past Canadian electoral districts

External links 
Riding history from the Library of Parliament

Former federal electoral districts of Ontario
Federal electoral districts of Toronto